Liyu Subdistrict is a subdistrict in Tianyuan District, Zhuzhou, Hunan province, China. , it has ten residential neighborhoods under its administration:
Liyu
Nantang
Wangjiaping
Zaoshi
Qiantang
Yuetang
Zhonglu
Yong'an Community
Jingyuan Community
Xiangwan Community

See also 
 List of township-level divisions of Hunan

References 

Subdistricts of Hunan
Zhuzhou